The Face of the Unknown is the second album by British progressive metal group Aeon Zen. Reviews were generally extremely positive, noting the "uplifting" nature of the record.

Track listing

Performers and album credits
Rich Hinks - lead, rhythm and acoustic guitars, bass guitars, keyboards and programming. Lead (tracks 7, 8 and 9), harsh and backing vocals, producer, mixer, artwork direction and design
Nick D'Virgilio (vocals, track 4)
Michael Eriksen (vocals, tracks 1 and 3)
Jem Godfrey (vocals, track 5)
Andi Kravljaca (vocals, tracks 2 and 6)
Matt Shepherd (guitar solo, track 2)
Cristian Van Schuerbeck (keyboard solo, track 6)
Jonny Tatum (vocals, tracks 8 and 10)

References

2010 albums
Aeon Zen albums